Bheriganga is an urban municipality located in Surkhet District of Karnali province of Nepal.

The municipality is divided into total 13 wards. Lekhparajul VDC was Incorporated with municipality in 2017 when government cancelled all old administration system and introduce new 753 local level administrative body.

The municipality is surrounded by Gurbha Kot in east, Barahatal in west, Birendranagar and Lekbesi in north and Bardiya District in south.

History
Bheriganga municipality was established on 2 December 2014 merging 3 VDC Chinchu, Maintada and Ramghat. Lekhparajul VDC Incorporated with municipality in 2017 when new administrative system came in force.

Demographics
At the time of the 2011 Nepal census, Bheriganga Municipality had a population of 41,865. Of these, 96.1% spoke Nepali, 2.5% Magar, 0.5% Gurung, 0.3% Raji, 0.2% Hindi, 0.1% Urdu, 0.1% Newar, 0.1% Maithili and 0.1% other languages as their first language.

In terms of ethnicity/caste, 42.8% were Chhetri, 23.5% Kami, 13.5% Magar, 4.9% Sarki, 4.2% Damai/Dholi, 4.1% Hill Brahmin, 2.6% Thakuri, 1.0% Sanyasi/Dasnami,  0.9% Badi and 2.5% others.

In terms of religion, 95.7% were Hindu, 3.6% Christian, 0.5% Buddhist and 0.3% Muslim.

References

External links
 www.bherigangamun.gov.np

Municipalities in Karnali Province
Nepal municipalities established in 2014